The 2019 Ribble Valley Borough Council election was held on 2 May 2019 to elect members of Ribble Valley Borough Council in England. This was on the same day as other local elections.

Summary

The 2019 Ribble Valley Borough elections saw the Labour Party lose its only elected Councillor. It also saw the Conservative Party make loses to the benefit of the Liberal Democrats who gained 6 Councillors on the Council. The Borough elections was first time all wards in the Ribble Valley went up for election since 2015.

|- style="text-align:center; background-color:#F2F2F2;"
! style="border: 1px solid #aaa;" colspan=2 rowspan=2 | Political party
! style="border: 1px solid #aaa;"           rowspan=2 | Leader
! style="border: 1px solid #aaa;" colspan=6           | Councillors
! style="border: 1px solid #aaa;" colspan=3           | Votes
|- style="text-align:center; background-color:#F2F2F2;"
! style="border: 1px solid #aaa;"                     | Candidates
! style="border: 1px solid #aaa;"                     | Total
! style="border: 1px solid #aaa;"                     | Gained
! style="border: 1px solid #aaa;"                     | Lost
! style="border: 1px solid #aaa;"                     | Net
! style="border: 1px solid #aaa;"                     | Of total (%)
! style="border: 1px solid #aaa;"                     | Total
! style="border: 1px solid #aaa;"                     | Of total (%)
! style="border: 1px solid #aaa;"                     | Change} (%)
|-
| data-sort-value="Conservative Party (UK)" 
| style="border: 1px solid #aaa; text-align: left;" scope="row" | 
| style="border: 1px solid #aaa; text-align: left;" | Theresa May
| style="border: 1px solid #aaa;" | 40
| style="border: 1px solid #aaa;" | 28
| style="border: 1px solid #aaa;" | 0
| style="border: 1px solid #aaa;" | 7
| style="border: 1px solid #aaa;" | 7
| style="border: 1px solid #aaa;" | 70.0
| style="border: 1px solid #aaa;" | 12,595
| style="border: 1px solid #aaa;" | 53.1
| style="border: 1px solid #aaa;" | 11.1
|-
| style="border: 1px solid #aaa;" data-sort-value="Liberal Democrats" 
| style="border: 1px solid #aaa; text-align: left;" scope="row" | 
| style="border: 1px solid #aaa; text-align: left;" | Vince Cable
| style="border: 1px solid #aaa;" | 16
| style="border: 1px solid #aaa;" | 10
| style="border: 1px solid #aaa;" | 6
| style="border: 1px solid #aaa;" | 0
| style="border: 1px solid #aaa;" | 6
| style="border: 1px solid #aaa;" | 25.0
| style="border: 1px solid #aaa;" | 4,809
| style="border: 1px solid #aaa;" | 20.3
| style="border: 1px solid #aaa;" | 9.7
|-
| style="border: 1px solid #aaa;" data-sort-value="Independent (politician)" 
| style="border: 1px solid #aaa; text-align: left;" scope="row" | 
| style="border: 1px solid #aaa; text-align: left;" | N/A
| style="border: 1px solid #aaa;" | 2
| style="border: 1px solid #aaa;" | 2
| style="border: 1px solid #aaa;" | 2
| style="border: 1px solid #aaa;" | 0
| style="border: 1px solid #aaa;" | 2
| style="border: 1px solid #aaa;" | 5.0
| style="border: 1px solid #aaa;" | 636
| style="border: 1px solid #aaa;" | 2.7
| style="border: 1px solid #aaa;" | 2.7
|-
| data-sort-value="Labour Party (UK)" 
| style="border: 1px solid #aaa; text-align: left;" scope="row" | 
| style="border: 1px solid #aaa; text-align: left;" | Jeremy Corbyn
| style="border: 1px solid #aaa;" | 35
| style="border: 1px solid #aaa;" | 0
| style="border: 1px solid #aaa;" | 0
| style="border: 1px solid #aaa;" | 1
| style="border: 1px solid #aaa;" | 1
| style="border: 1px solid #aaa;" | 0.0
| style="border: 1px solid #aaa;" | 5,505
| style="border: 1px solid #aaa;" | 23.2
| style="border: 1px solid #aaa;" | 2.0
|-
| data-sort-value="Green Party of England and Wales" 
| style="border: 1px solid #aaa; text-align: left;" scope="row" | 
| style="border: 1px solid #aaa; text-align: left;" | Siân Berry and Jonathan Bartley
| style="border: 1px solid #aaa;" | 2
| style="border: 1px solid #aaa;" | 0
| style="border: 1px solid #aaa;" | 0
| style="border: 1px solid #aaa;" | 0
| style="border: 1px solid #aaa;" | 0
| style="border: 1px solid #aaa;" | 0.0
| style="border: 1px solid #aaa;" | 104
| style="border: 1px solid #aaa;" | 0.4
| style="border: 1px solid #aaa;" | 0.4
|-
| data-sort-value="UK Independence Party" 
| style="border: 1px solid #aaa; text-align: left;" scope="row" | 
| style="border: 1px solid #aaa; text-align: left;" | Gerard Batten
| style="border: 1px solid #aaa;" | 1
| style="border: 1px solid #aaa;" | 0
| style="border: 1px solid #aaa;" | 0
| style="border: 1px solid #aaa;" | 0
| style="border: 1px solid #aaa;" | 0
| style="border: 1px solid #aaa;" | 0.0
| style="border: 1px solid #aaa;" | 76
| style="border: 1px solid #aaa;" | 0.3
| style="border: 1px solid #aaa;" | 0.3
|}

Ward results

Alston and Hothershall

Billington and Langho

Brockhall and Dinckley

Chatburn

Clayton-le-Dale and Salesbury

Derby and Thornley

Dilworth

Edisford and Low Moor

Gisburn and Rimington

Hurst Green and Whitewell

Littlemoor

Mellor

Primrose

Ribchester

Sabden

Salthill

St Mary's

Waddington, Bashall Eaves and Mitton

West Bradford and Grindleton

Whalley and Painter Wood

East Whalley, Read and Simonstone

Whalley Nethertown

Wilpshire and Ramsgreave

Wiswell and Barrow

By-elections

Littlemore

Primrose

References

2019 English local elections
May 2019 events in the United Kingdom
2019
2010s in Lancashire